St Brendan's Gaelic Football Club are a Gaelic games club, based in London, and specialising in the sport of Gaelic football.

History

St Brendan's was founded in 1956, in the Old Botwell Paris Hall, in Middlesex. Originally starting as a hurling and football club, by 1960, the club had turned its attention primarily to football. Based in south west London, the club serves the areas of Twickenham, Teddington, Richmond, Whitton, Hounslow, Ealing and Feltham. The club has had success in the London Championships, winning 3 Senior Championships and 1 Intermediate Championship in 2011.

Titles
In 2012 the club won the an Intermediate Championship title. 2014 saw St Brendan's reach the Intermediate Championship final again, only to be beaten by North London Shamrocks. They did, however, win the Division 2 league that year. In 2017, St Brendan's won the Murphy Cup. Still in the intermediate grade, St Brendan's have reached the semi-final stages of the competition over several years. St Brendan's appeared in 8 Senior Finals, winning 3. After being beaten finalists in 1990, 1993, 1997, 2001 and 2005, the club won the 1994 final by beating Taras on a score line of 1-9 to 1-4. The next Senior championship win came against St. Clarets in 2002. 2006 saw the last senior title for the St Brendan's team vs. Taras. They subsequently lost to Dr Crokes in an 2007 senior All Ireland quarter final.

County players

Several club players have represented London at Senior county level.

References

Gaelic Athletic Association clubs in Britain
Gaelic Athletic Association clubs in London